Masae (written: 昌江, 昌枝, 政江 or 雅恵) is a feminine Japanese given name. Notable people with the name include:

, Japanese actress known as Setsuko Hara
, Japanese volleyball player
Masae Komiya (born 1975), Japanese goalball player
, Japanese footballer and manager
, Japanese judoka

Japanese feminine given names